The Saptarishi are the seven rishis of ancient India who are extolled in the Vedas, and other Hindu literature. The Vedic Samhitas never enumerate these rishis by name, although later Vedic texts such as the Brahmanas and Upanisads do so.

Hinduism 
An early prototype of the "Saptarishi" concept may stem from the six families associated with the six "Family Books" in the Rigveda Samhita (Mandalas 2–7 in ascending order: Gṛtsamāda, Viśvāmitra, Vāmadeva, Atri, Bhardwaja, Vasiṣṭha). While not a "Family Book", Mandala 8 is mostly attributed to Kaṇva, who could be considered the 7th prototypical Saptarishi.

The earliest formal list of the seven rishis is given by Jaiminiya Brahmana 2.218–221: Agastya, Atri, Bhardwaja, Gautama, Jamadagni, Vashistha, and Vishvamitra followed by Brihadaranyaka Upanisad 2.2.6 with a slightly different list: Atri, Bharadwaja, Gautama, Jamadagni, Kashyapa, Vashistha, and Vishvamitra. The late Gopatha Brahmana 1.2.8 has Vashistha, Vishvamitra, Jamadagni, Gautama, Bharadvaja, Gungu, Agastya, and Kashyapa.

In post-Vedic texts, different lists appear; some of these rishis were recognized as the 'mind-born sons' (Sanskrit: मनस पुत्र, manasaputra) of Brahma, the representation of the Supreme Being as Creator. Other representations are Maheshvara or Shiva as the Destroyer and Vishnu as the Preserver. Since these seven rishis were also among the primary eight rishis, who were considered to be the ancestors of the Gotras of Brahmins, the birth of these rishis was mythicized.

According to legend, the seven rishis in the next manvantara will be Diptimat, Galava, Parashurama, Kripa, Drauni or Ashwatthama, Vyasa, and Rishyasringa.

Names 

A manvantara (age of Manu) is a unit of time within a kalpa (day of Brahma). There are fourteen manvantaras in a kalpa, each separated by sandhyas (connecting periods). Each manvantara is ruled by a different Manu, with the current seventh one ruled by Vaivasvata Manu. Rishis and their sons are born anew in each manvantara.

Lists 

1. The Shatapatha Brahmana and Brihadaranyaka Upanishad(2.2.4) acknowledge the names of seven rishis(or Saptarshis) as: 
Atri
Bharadvaja
Gautama Maharishi
Jamadagni
Kashyapa
Vasistha
Vishvamitra

2. The Krishna Yajurveda in the Sandhya-Vandana Mantras has it as: 
Angiras
Atri
Bhrigu
Gautama Maharishi
Kashyapa
Kutsa
Vasistha

3. The Mahabharata offers the seven rishis' names: 
Marichi
Atri
Pulaha
Pulastya
Kratu
Vasistha
Angiras

4. The Brihat Samhita offers the seven rishis' names as: 
Marichi
Vasistha
Angiras
Atri
Pulastya
Pulaha
Kratu

Jainism

In Jainism it is stated that, "Once at Mathura situated in Uttar Pradesh seven Riddhidhari Digamber saints having 'Aakaashgamini Vidhya' came during the rainy season for chaturmaas whose names were 1.) Surmanyu, 2.) Shrimanyu, 3.) Shrinichay, 4.) Sarvasundar, 5.) Jayvaan, 6.) Vinaylaala and 7.) Jaymitra. They all were sons of King Shri Nandan of Prabhapurnagar and queen Dharini. Shri Nandan king took diksha becoming shishya of Omniscient Pritinkar Muniraaj and attained salvation. Because of great tapcharan of these seven digamber munis the 'Mahamaari' disease stopped its evil effect and they all gained the name as 'Saptrishi'. Many idols of these seven munis were made after that event by King Shatrughna in all four directions of the city."

Sikhism
In the Dasam Granth, a text which is traditionally attributed to Guru Gobind Singh, mentions the biographies of the seven rishis i.e. Valmiki, Kashyap, Sukra, Baches, Vyas, Khat and Kalidas. These are described under the composition Brahm Avtar.

Astronomy 
In ancient Indian astronomy, the asterism of the Big Dipper (part of the constellation of Ursa Major) is called saptarishi, with the seven stars representing seven rishis, namely "Vashistha", "Marichi", "Pulastya", "Pulaha", "Atri", "Angiras" and "Kratu". There is another star slightly visible within it, known as "Arundhati". Arundhati and Vashishtha are married, and together form the Mizar double.

In Hindu astronomy, the seven stars of the Saptarshi Mandala, or Big Dipper are named as:

Vasishtha is accompanied by Arundhati, a faint companion star (Alcor/80 Ursa Majoris). The valid avatar's clan is supposed to be named after their ashvamedha.

See also

 Nachiketa
 Dhruva
 Apkallu

References

Rishis
Hindu astronomy